Mariveleño (also known as Magbikin, Bataan Ayta, or Magbukun Ayta) is a Sambalic language. It has around 500 speakers (Wurm 2000) and is spoken within an Aeta community in Mariveles in the Philippines.

Geographic distribution
Reid (1994) reports the following Magbikin locations.
Kanáwon, Morong, Bataan
Bayanbayanan, Magbikin, Mariveles, Bataan

Himes (2012: 491) also collected Magbukun data from the two locations of:
Biaan, Mariveles, Bataan
Canawan, Morong, Bataan

Cabanding (2014), citing Neil (2012), reports the following Magbukon locations in Bataan Province.
Dangcol, Balanga, Bataan
Kinaragan, Limay, Bataan
Kanawan, Morong, Bataan
Pita, Bayan-bayanan in Orion, Bataan
Pag-asa, Orani, Bataan
Ulingan, Matanglaw, and Magduhat (all in Bagac, Bataan)
Sitio Luoban in Samal, Bataan
Bangkal in Abucay, Bataan

See also
Languages of the Philippines

References

Cabanding, Monica. 2014. The Deictic Demonstratives of Ayta Magbukun. The Philippines ESL Journal, vol. 13. 
Neil, David R. 2012. An ethnographic study of the Magbukon literary arts among the Ayta of Bataan. Abucay, Bataan: Bataan Peninsula State University.
Neil, David R. 2014. The Magbukon Literary Arts among the Aetas of Bataan, Philippines. IAMURE International Journal of Multidisciplinary Research, Vol. 11 No. 1 October 2014.  (Online)

Further reading 
 
 
Chrétien, Douglas C. (1951). The dialect of the Sierra de Mariveles Negritos. (University of California Publications in Linguistics, 4.2.) Berkeley/Los Angeles: Berkeley and Los Angeles: University of California Press. 109pp.
Hammarström, Harald; Forkel, Robert; Haspelmath, Martin; Bank, Sebastian, eds. (2016). "Bataan Ayta". Glottolog 2.7. Jena: Max Planck Institute for the Science of Human History.
 
Reed, W. A. 1904. Negritos of Zambales. (Ethnological Survey Publications, 2(1).) Manila: Bureau of Public Printing. 100pp.
 
 
 
Schadenberg, A. (1880). Ueber die Negritos in den Philippinen. Zeitschrift für Ethnologie XII. 133-172.
Wimbish, John. (1986). The languages of the Zambales mountains: A Philippine lexicostatistic study. In University of North Dakota Session, 133-142. Grand Forks, North Dakota: Summer Institute of Linguistics.

Endangered Austronesian languages
Sambalic languages
Aeta languages
Languages of Bataan